The Myanmar Ambassador in Brussels is the official representative of the Government in Naypyidaw to the Government of Belgium and concurrently to the European Commission.

History
Since 1989 Union of Myanmar 
From  to  he had his Residence in Bonn as  Myanmar Ambassador to Germany.

List of representatives

References 

 
Belgium
Myanmar